Rewa State, also known as Rewah, was a Rajput princely state of India, surrounding its eponymous capital, the town of Rewa.

Rewa was also the third wealthiest principality in Central India, with an average revenue of rupees 2.9 million in 1901. The Bagelkhand Agency was dissolved in 1933, following which Rewa was placed under the authority of the Indore Residency. Rewah state had a 15 gun salute.

History 

According to legend, the kingdom of Rewa was founded around 1140 CE. On 5 October 1812, it became a British protectorate. Between 1 April 1875 and 15 October 1895, Rewa remained under the direct colonial administration of British India.

The ruler of Rewa ruled from Bandhavgarh during the founding reign of Raja Vyaghra Dev, who was a direct descendant of Gujarati warrior king Vir Dhawal. In 1617, Maharaja Vikramaditya Singh moved his capital to Rewa.  Maharaja Martand Singh was the last ruler of Rewa who acceded to the Union of India after the country became India.

Akbar was given refuge at Rewa at age 10, when his father Humayun fled India following a defeat in war. Prince Ramchandra Singh and Akbar grew up together as royal heirs. Maharaja Ramchandra Singh and Akbar remained friends. In the mid-1550s, Raja Ramachandra Singh Baghela maintained a musically talented court, including the legendary Tansen. Two of the Navratnas of Akbar, Tansen and Birbal (originally named Mahesh Das) were sent from Rewa by Maharaja Ramchandra Singh once Akbar became Emperor of India. In 1580, Akbar reorganized his empire into 12 Subahs and combined the provinces of Jaunpur Sultanate, Kara-Manikpur and territory of Bandhogarh into the Subah of Ilahabad.

Rewa was the first princely state in India to declare Hindi the national language, in the times of Maharaja Gulab Singh. He is also credited for declaring the first responsive government in modern India, providing citizens of Rewa state a right to question their monarch's decisions.

The state came under British paramountcy in 1812 and remained a princely state within the British Raj until India's independence in 1947.

During the long minority of Raja Venkat Raman Singh (1876, 1880–1918), the administration of the state was reformed. In 1901, the town boasted a high school, a "model jail" and two hospitals: the Victoria hospital and the Zenana hospital. However, it was still adjudged among the most backward areas of the country by V.P. Menon, after he visited the state in 1947.

Post-independence period 
Upon India's independence in 1947, the maharaja of Rewa acceded unto the Dominion of India. Rewa later merged with the Union of India and became part of Vindhya Pradesh, which was formed by the merger of the former princely states of the Baghelkhand and Bundelkhand agencies. Rewa served as the capital of the new state.

In 1956, Vindhya Pradesh was merged with other nearby political entities to form the Indian constitutive state of Madhya Pradesh. The Maharaja's palace was converted into a museum.

In February 2007, the most-extensive book on the history of Rewa, Baghelkhand, or the Tigers’ Lair by Dr D.E.U Baker, was published by Oxford University Press.

Bagheli is local language of Rewa.

Rulers

The predecessor state, Bandhogarh, was founded  1140. The chiefs of Rewa were Baghel Rajputs descended from the Rajput Solanki clan, which ruled over Gujarat from the 10th to 13th century. His son Karandeo, married a Kalchuri (Haihaya) princess of Mandla, and received in dowry the fort of Bandhogarh which, until its destruction in 1597 by Akbar, was the Baghel capital. In 1298, Ulugh Khan, acting under orders of the sultan of Delhi, Alauddin Khilji, drove the last Vaghela ruler of Gujarat from his country and this is believed to have caused a considerable migration of Baghels to Bandhogarh. Until the 15th century, the Baghels of Bandhogarh were engaged in extending their possessions and escaped the attention of the Delhi Sultans, in 1498–1499, Sikandar Lodi failed in his attempt to take the fort of Bandhogarh.

List of rulers 
The following is a list of known rulers of Rewa (or its predecessor state, Bandhogarh), in chronological order by their reign.  They took the title of Raja or, from 1857, Majaraja or Maharaja.

 Maharaja Vyaghra Deo
 Maharaja Karan Deo
 Maharaja Sohag Deo
 Maharaja Sarang Deo
 Maharaja Vilas Deo, established the Bilaspur city.
 Maharaja Bhimal Deo
 Maharaja Anik Deo [Ranik Deo]
 Maharaja Valan Deo
 Maharaja Dalkeshwar Deo
 Maharaja Malkeshwar Deo
 Maharaja Variyar Deo
 Maharaja Bullar Deo
 Maharaja Singh Deo
 Maharaja Bhairam Deo
 Maharaja Narhari Deo
 Maharaja Bheer Deo
 Maharaja Shalivahan Deo, 1495–1500, Raja of Bandhogarh
 Maharaja Veer Singh Deo, r.1500–1540, established the town of Birsinghpur.
 Maharaja Virbhan Singh, r.1540–1555 ; fought against Sher shah with Chandela Rajputs during the siege of Kalinjar Fort
 Maharaja Ramchandra Singh, r.1555–1592
 Maharaja Birbhadra Singh Deo, 1592-1602
 Maharaja Duryodhan Singh(illegitimate son of Birbhadra Singh Deo),1602-1618,(deposed); His accession gave rise to disturbances. Akbar intervened, captured and dismantled the Bandhogarh fort in 1597 after a siege of eight months.
 Maharaja Vikramaditya Deo, r.1618–1630.  He founded the town of Rewa in 1618 (which perhaps means that he undertook the construction of palaces and other buildings there because the place had already assumed importance in 1554 when it was held by Jalal Khan, son of emperor Shershah Suri).
 Maharaja Amar Singh II, r.1630–1643, established the town of Amarpatan.
 Maharaja Anoop Singh Deo, r.1643–1660
 Maharaja Bhao Singh Deo, r.1660–1690. He married twice but died childless.
 Maharaja Anirudh Singh Deo, r.1690–1700, a grandson of Raja Anoop Singh, he was adopted by and succeeded his childless uncle, Raja Bhao Singh.
 Maharaja Avadhut Singh Deo, r.1700–1755. The state was sacked by Hirde Shah of Panna, 1731, causing the Raja to flee to Pratapgarh in Oudh (Awadh).
 Maharaja Ajit Singh Deo, r.1755–1809. The state was sacked by Nayak Yashwantrao alias Shrimant Jaswantkubje from Bundelkhand, in which several Kalchuri families died defending the state .
 Maharaja Jai Singh Deo, b.1765, r.1809–1835. In 1812, a body of Pindaris raided Rewa from Mirzapur territory, for which Jai Singh was called upon to accede to a treaty acknowledging the protection of the British Government, and agreed to refer all disputes with neighbouring chiefs to their arbitration and to allow British troops in his territories.
 Maharaja Vishwanath Singh Deo, b.1789, r.1835–1854.
 Maharaja Raghuraj Singh Ju Deo Bahadur, b.1831, r.1854–1857 as Raja then as Majaraja 1857–1880. He helped the British quell the uprisings in the neighbouring Mandla and Jabalpur districts in the mutiny of 1857. For this service the Sohagpur (Shahdol) and Amarkantak parganas were restored to his rule (having been seized by the Marathas in the beginning of the century), and he was made the first Majaraja of Rewa, ruling until his death on 5 February 1880.
 Maharaja Venkatraman Ramanuj Prasad Singh Ju Deo Bahadur, b.1876, r.1880–1918.
 Maharaja Gulab Singh Deo Bahadur, b.1903, r.1918–1946 (deposed).
 Maharaja Sajjan Singh of Ratlam (Regent), b.1880, r.1918–1919, 1922–1923.
 Philip Bannerman Warburton (Interim), b.1878, r.1919. 
 Dewan Bahadur Brijmohan Nath Zutshi (Regent, President of Regency Council), b.1877, r.1920–1922.
 Elliot James Dowell Colvin (Interim), b.1885, r.1922.
 Maharaja Martand Singh Deo Bahadur, b.1923, r.1946–1995.
 Maharaja Bandhvesh Sri Maharaja Pushpraj Singhji Deo Bahadur, b. 1960, r. 1995-present

References

External links 
 
 

Princely states of Madhya Pradesh
Rewa district
1790s establishments in India
1947 disestablishments in India
Rajputs
Vaghelas